Bill Delano is a documentary film maker. He began his film career at American University in Washington DC where he received a degree in Philosophy and Video Journalism.  His introduction to TV production began with an internship with FRONTLINE on the hit show “Is Wal-Mart Good For America”. 
Upon graduating, he directed, shot, and edited his first documentary entitled “Chasing Lance: the Fans Story”, which aired in prime time on the Travel Channel. He later gained further experience working on BET's acclaimed documentary series “Season of the Tiger”.

Between assignments he has led various seminars and initiatives.  He has trained Video Journalists for the launch of a new television network and taught Grad Students the art of one-man-band TV production at Northwestern University.  
After traveling to North-eastern Brazil

External links
http://www.pbs.org/wgbh/pages/frontline/shows/walmart/
https://web.archive.org/web/20070304125547/http://www.bet.com/Site%2BManagement/SeasonoftheTiger.htm
http://www.rhythmicuprising.org/
http://travel.discovery.com/nyatg

Year of birth missing (living people)
Living people
American television personalities